The commander of Space Operations Command is a lieutenant general who leads the field command that provide space forces to the United States Space Command and supports other unified combatant commands. A senior leader in the Space Force, it is only one of three field commanders and, of which, only one of two held by a lieutenant general.

Space Operations Command (SpOC) was established by redesignating the Air Force Space Command as Space Operations Command, which was redesignated prior as Headquarters, United States Space Force to serve in transitional capacity as the new service's headquarters. The commander of SpOC, thus, can be traced back to 1 September 1982, when General James V. Hartinger served as the first commander of Space Command.

Like any other three-star officer position in the U.S. Armed Forces, the commander of SpOC is nominated by the president of the United States and must be confirmed by the U.S. Senate. The current commander of SpOC is Lieutenant General Stephen Whiting.

List of commanders

List of vice commanders

List of deputy commanders

List of senior enlisted leaders

See also
 Space Operations Command
 Commander of Space Systems Command
 Commander of Space Training and Readiness Command

References

Notes

Citations

United States Space Force generals